Mahajeran-e Kamar (also Romanized as Mahājerān-e Kamar, Mahajaran Kamar, and Mohājerān-e Kamar) is a village in Pol-e Doab Rural District, Zalian District, Shazand County, Markazi Province, Iran. At the 2006 census, its population was 160, in 45 families.

References 

Populated places in Shazand County